Major General Gebre Adhana Woldezgu is a general with the Ethiopian National Defense Force (ENDF). He has served as the Force Commander of the United Nations Interim Security Force for Abyei (UNISFA) since 4 April 2018.

Major General Woldezgu was appointed as Force Commander of UNISFA by United Nations Secretary-General António Guterres. On 19 Feb 2019, it was announced that Woldezgu's term would end on 23 April 2019. He will be succeeded by Major General Mehari Zewde Gebremariam.

References

Ethiopian officials of the United Nations
Living people
Ethiopian generals
Year of birth missing (living people)